1933 earthquake may refer to:

1933 Baffin Bay earthquake (Canada, tsunami)
1933 Diexi earthquake (China)
1933 Long Beach earthquake (Los Angeles, California, US) (small tsunami)
1933 Sanriku earthquake (Japan) (great, tsunami)

See also
List of earthquakes in 1933